Paraíso is a corregimiento in Pocrí District, Los Santos Province, Panama with a population of 597 as of 2010. Its population as of 1990 was 574; its population as of 2000 was 593.

References

Corregimientos of Los Santos Province